Chirabandhavya is a 1993 Indian Kannada-language romance drama film directed by M. S. Rajashekar and produced by Shashwathi Chitra. The film stars Shiva Rajkumar, Subhashri and Bharathi. The film's plot is based on the novel of the same name, written by Sai Suthe. The movie, which was Shiva Rajkumar's 17th movie in a lead role, was his first movie to not complete 50 days.

Cast 
 Shiva Rajkumar 
 Subhashri
 Bharathi (Sukanya)
 Chi Guru Dutt
 K. S. Ashwath
 Thoogudeepa Srinivas
 Pandari Bai
 Mynavathi
 Girija Lokesh
 Ashwath Narayan
 Pramila Joshai
 Avinash

Soundtrack 
The soundtrack of the film was composed by Hamsalekha.

References

External links 
 Full movie

1993 films
1990s Kannada-language films
1993 romantic drama films
Indian romantic drama films
Films based on Indian novels
Films directed by M. S. Rajashekar
Films scored by Hamsalekha